The 2014–15 Pittsburgh Panthers women's basketball team represented the University of Pittsburgh during the 2014–15 college basketball season. Suzie McConnell-Serio resumes the responsibility as head coach for a second consecutive season. The Panthers, second year members of the Atlantic Coast Conference, will play their home games at the Petersen Events Center. They finished the season 20–12, 9–7 in ACC play to finish in seventh place. They lost in the second round of the ACC women's tournament to Virginia Tech. They received at-large bid of the NCAA women's tournament where defeated Chattanooga in the first round before getting defeated by Tennessee in the second round.

2014–15 media

Pitt Panthers Sports Network
The Pitt Panthers Sports Network will broadcast all Panthers games on WJAS. George Von Benko will provide the play-by-play while Jen Tuscano will provide the analysis. Non-televised home games can be watched online via Pitt Panthers TV with the Panthers Sports Network call.

2014–15 Roster

Schedule

|-
!colspan=9 style="background:#1C2A43; color:#D0B67B;"|Exhibition

|-
!colspan=9 style="background:#1C2A43; color:#D0B67B;"|Regular Season

|-
!colspan=9 style="background:#D0B67B;"| 2015 ACC Tournament

|-
!colspan=9 style="background:#D0B67B;"| NCAA Women's Tournament

Rankings
2014–15 NCAA Division I women's basketball rankings

See also
 Pittsburgh Panthers women's basketball

References

Pittsburgh Panthers women's basketball seasons
Pittsburgh
Pitt